Trumpism is a term for the political ideologies, social emotions, style of governance, political movement, and set of mechanisms for acquiring and keeping control of power associated with Donald Trump and his political base. Trumpists and Trumpian are terms used to refer to those exhibiting characteristics of Trumpism, whereas political supporters of Trump are known as Trumpers.

The precise composition of Trumpism is contentious and is sufficiently complex to overwhelm any single framework of analysis; it has been referred to as an American political variant of the far-right and the national-populist and neo-nationalist sentiment seen in multiple nations worldwide from the late 2010s to the early 2020s. Though not strictly limited to any one party, Trump supporters became a significant faction of the Republican Party in the United States, with the remainder often characterized as "establishment" in contrast. Some Republicans became members of the Never Trump movement, with several leaving the party in protest of Trump's ascendancy.

Some commentators have rejected the populist designation for Trumpism and view it instead as part of a trend towards a new form of fascism or neo-fascism, with some referring to it as explicitly fascist and others as authoritarian and illiberal. Others have more mildly identified it as a specific lite version of fascism in the United States. Some historians, including many of those using a new fascism classification, write of the hazards of direct comparisons with European fascist regimes of the 1930s, stating that while there are parallels, there are also important dissimilarities.

The label Trumpism has been applied to national-conservative and national-populist movements in other Western democracies, and many politicians outside of the United States have been labeled as staunch allies of Trump or Trumpism, or even as their country's equivalent to Trump, by various news agencies; among them are Silvio Berlusconi, Jair Bolsonaro, Horacio Cartes, Rodrigo Duterte, Pauline Hanson, Recep Tayyip Erdoğan, Nigel Farage, Boris Johnson, George Galloway, Hong Joon-Pyo, Jarosław Kaczyński, Bidzina Ivanishvili, Marine Le Pen, Narendra Modi, Benjamin Netanyahu, Viktor Orbán, Najib Razak, Matteo Salvini, Geert Wilders and Yoon Suk-yeol.

Populist themes, sentiments, and methods 
Trumpism started its development predominantly during Trump's 2016 presidential campaign. For many scholars, it denotes a populist political method that suggests nationalistic answers to political, economic, and social problems. These inclinations are refracted into such policy preferences as immigration restrictionism, trade protectionism, isolationism, and opposition to entitlement reform. As a political method, populism is not driven by any particular ideology. Former National Security Advisor and close Trump advisor John Bolton states this is true of Trump, disputing that Trumpism even exists in any meaningful philosophical sense, adding that "[t]he man does not have a philosophy. And people can try and draw lines between the dots of his decisions. They will fail."

Writing for the Routledge Handbook of Global Populism (2019), Olivier Jutel claims, "What Donald Trump reveals is that the various iterations of right-wing American populism have less to do with a programmatic social conservatism or libertarian economics than with enjoyment." Referring to the populism of Trump, sociologist Michael Kimmel states that it "is not a theory [or] an ideology, it's an emotion. And the emotion is righteous indignation that the government is screwing 'us'". Kimmel notes that "Trump is an interesting character because he channels all that sense of what I called 'aggrieved entitlement,'" a term Kimmel defines as "that sense that those benefits to which you believed yourself entitled have been snatched away from you by unseen forces larger and more powerful. You feel yourself to be the heir to a great promise, the American Dream, which has turned into an impossible fantasy for the very people who were supposed to inherit it."

Communications scholar Zizi Papacharissi explains the utility of being ideologically vague, and using terms and slogans that can mean anything the supporter wants them to mean. "When these publics thrive in affective engagement it's because they've found an affective hook that's built around an open signifier that they get to use and reuse and re-employ. So yes, of course you know, President Trump has used MAGA; that's an open signifier that pulls in all of these people, and is open because it allows them all to assign different meanings to it. So MAGA works for connecting publics that are different, because it is open enough to permit people to ascribe their own meaning to it."

Other contributors to the Routledge Handbook of Populism note that populist leaders rather than being ideology driven are instead pragmatic and opportunistic regarding themes, ideas and beliefs that strongly resonate with their followers. Exit polling data suggests the campaign was successful at mobilizing the "white disenfranchised", the lower- to working-class European-Americans who are experiencing growing social inequality and who often have stated opposition to the American political establishment. Ideologically, Trumpism has a right-wing populist accent.

Focus on sentiments

Historian Peter E. Gordon raises the possibility that "Trump, far from being a violation of the norm, actually signifies an emergent norm of the social order" where the categories of the psychological and political have dissolved. In accounting for Trump's election and ability to sustain stable high approval ratings among a significant segment of voters, Erika Tucker argues in the book Trump and Political Philosophy that though all presidential campaigns have strong emotions associated with them, Trump was able to recognize, and then to gain the trust and loyalty of those who, like him felt a particular set of strong emotions about perceived changes in the United States. She notes, "Political psychologist Drew Westen has argued that Democrats are less successful at gauging and responding to affective politics—issues that arouse strong emotional states in citizens." 

Like many academics examining the populist appeal of Trump's messaging, Hidalgo-Tenorio and Benítez-Castro draw on the theories of Ernesto Laclau writing, "The emotional appeal of populist discourse is key to its polarising effects, this being so much so that populism 'would be unintelligible without the affective component.' (Laclau 2005, 11)" Scholars from a wide number of fields have argued that particular affective themes and the dynamics of their impact on social media-connected followers characterize Trump and his supporters.

Pleasure from sympathetic company
Communications scholar Michael Carpini states that "Trumpism is a culmination of trends that have been occurring for several decades. What we are witnessing is nothing short of a fundamental shift in the relationships between journalism, politics, and democracy." Among the shifts, Carpini identifies "the collapsing of the prior [media] regime's presumed and enforced distinctions between news and entertainment." Examining Trump's use of media for the book Language in the Trump Era, communication professor Marco Jacquemet writes that "It's an approach that, like much of the rest of Trump's ideology and policy agenda, assumes (correctly, it appears) that his audiences care more about shock and entertainment value in their media consumption than almost anything else." 

The perspective is shared among other communication academics, with Plasser & Ulram (2003) describing a media logic which emphasizes "personalization ... a political star system ... [and] sports based dramatization." Olivier Jutel notes that "Donald Trump's celebrity status and reality-TV rhetoric of 'winning' and 'losing' corresponds perfectly to these values", asserting that "Fox News and conservative personalities from Rush Limbaugh, Glenn Beck and Alex Jones do not simply represent a new political and media voice but embody the convergence of politics and media in which affect and enjoyment are the central values of media production."

Studying Trump's use of social media, anthropologist Jessica Johnson finds that social emotional pleasure plays a central role, writing, "Rather than finding accurate news meaningful, Facebook users find the affective pleasure of connectivity addictive, whether or not the information they share is factual, and that is how communicative capitalism captivates subjects as it holds them captive." Looking back at the world prior to social media, communications researcher Brian L. Ott writes: "I'm nostalgic for the world of television that Neil Postman (1985) argued, produced the 'least well-informed people in the Western world' by packaging news as entertainment. (pp. 106–107) Twitter is producing the most self-involved people in history by treating everything one does or thinks as newsworthy. Television may have assaulted journalism, but Twitter killed it." Commenting on Trump's support among Fox News viewers, Hofstra University Communication Dean Mark Lukasiewicz has a similar perspective, writing, "Tristan Harris famously said that social networks are about 'affirmation, not information'—and the same can be said about cable news, especially in prime time."

 Arlie Russell Hochschild's perspective on the relationship between Trump supporters and their preferred sources of information - whether social media friends or news and commentary stars, is that they are trusted due to the affective bond they have with them. As media scholar Daniel Kreiss summarizes Hochschild, "Trump, along with Fox News, gave these strangers in their own land the hope that they would be restored to their rightful place at the center of the nation, and provided a very real emotional release from the fetters of political correctness that dictated they respect people of color, lesbians and gays, and those of other faiths ... that the network's personalities share the same 'deep story' of political and social life, and therefore they learn from them 'what to feel afraid, angry, and anxious about.'"

From Kreiss's 2018 account of conservative personalities and media, information became less important than providing a sense of familial bonding, where "family provides a sense of identity, place, and belonging; emotional, social, and cultural support and security; and gives rise to political and social affiliations and beliefs." Hochschild gives the example of one woman who explains the familial bond of trust with the star personalities. "Bill O'Reilly is like a steady, reliable dad. Sean Hannity is like a difficult uncle who rises to anger too quickly. Megyn Kelly is like a smart sister. Then there's Greta Van Susteren. And Juan Williams, who came over from NPR, which was too left for him, the adoptee. They're all different, just like in a family."

Media scholar Olivier Jutel focuses on the neoliberal privatization and market segmentation of the public square, noting that, "Affect is central to the brand strategy of Fox which imagined its journalism not in terms of servicing the rational citizen in the public sphere but in 'craft[ing] intensive relationships with their viewers' (Jones, 2012: 180) in order to sustain audience share across platforms." In this segmented market, Trump "offers himself as an ego-ideal to an individuated public of enjoyment that coalesce around his media brand as part of their own performance of identity." Jutel cautions that it is not just conservative media companies that benefit from the transformation of news media to conform to values of spectacle and reality TV drama. "Trump is a definitive product of mediatized politics providing the spectacle that drives ratings and affective media consumption, either as part of his populist movement or as the liberal resistance."

Researchers give differing emphasis to which emotions are important to followers. Michael Richardson argues in the Journal of Media and Cultural Studies that "affirmation, amplification and circulation of disgust is one of the primary affective drivers of Trump's political success." Richardson agrees with Ott about the "entanglement of Trumpian affect and social media crowds" who seek "affective affirmation, confirmation and amplification. Social media postings of crowd experiences accumulate as 'archives of feelings' that are both dynamic in nature and affirmative of social values (Pybus 2015, 239)."

Using Trump as an example, social trust expert Karen Jones follows philosopher Annette Baier in claiming that the masters of the art of creating trust and distrust are populist politicians and criminals. On this view, it is not moral philosophers who are the experts at discerning different forms of trust, but members of this class of practitioners who "show a masterful appreciation of the ways in which certain emotional states drive out trust and replace it with distrust." Jones sees Trump as an exemplar of this class who recognize that fear and contempt are powerful tools that can reorient networks of trust and distrust in social networks in order to alter how a potential supporter "interprets the words, deeds, and motives of the other." She points out that the tactic is used globally writing, "A core strategy of Donald Trump, both as candidate and president, has been to manufacture fear and contempt towards some undocumented migrants (among other groups). This strategy of manipulating fear and contempt has gone global, being replicated with minor local adjustment in Australia, Austria, Hungary, Poland, Italy and the United Kingdom."

Right-wing authoritarian populism 
Other academics have made politically urgent warnings about Trumpian authoritarianism, such as Yale sociologist Philip S. Gorski who writes, 

Some academics regard such authoritarian backlash as a feature of liberal democracies. Some have even argued that Trump is a totalitarian capitalist exploiting the "fascist impulses of his ordinary supporters that hide in plain sight." Michelle Goldberg, an opinion columnist for The New York Times, compares "the spirit of Trumpism" to classical fascist themes. The "mobilizing vision" of fascism is of "the national community rising phoenix-like after a period of encroaching decadence which all but destroyed it", which "sounds a lot like MAGA" (Make America Great Again) according to Goldberg. Similarly, like the Trump movement, fascism sees a "need for authority by natural chiefs (always male), culminating in a national chieftain who alone is capable of incarnating the group's historical destiny." They believe in "the superiority of the leader's instincts over abstract and universal reason".

Conservative columnist George Will considers Trumpism similar to fascism, stating that Trumpism is "a mood masquerading as a doctrine". National unity is based "on shared domestic dreads"—for fascists the "Jews", for Trump the media ("enemies of the people"), "elites" and "globalists". Solutions come not from tedious "incrementalism and conciliation", but from the leader (who claims "only I can fix it") unfettered by procedure. The political base is kept entertained with mass rallies, but inevitably the strongman develops a contempt for those he leads. Both are based on machismo, and in the case of Trumpism, "appeals to those in thrall to country-music manliness: 'We're truck-driving, beer-drinking, big-chested Americans too freedom-loving to let any itsy-bitsy virus make us wear masks.'"

Disputing the view that the surge of support for Trumpism and Brexit represents a new phenomenon, political scientist Karen Stenner and social psychologist Jonathan Haidt present the argument that  Discussing the statistical basis for their conclusions regarding the triggering of such waves, Stenner and Haidt present the view that "authoritarians, by their very nature, want to believe in authorities and institutions; they want to feel they are part of a cohesive community. Accordingly, they seem (if anything) to be modestly inclined toward giving authorities and institutions the benefit of the doubt, and lending them their support until the moment these seem incapable of maintaining 'normative order'"; the authors write that this normative order is regularly threatened by liberal democracy itself because it tolerates a lack of consensus in group values and beliefs, tolerates disrespect of group authorities, nonconformity to group norms, or norms proving questionable, and in general promotes diversity and freedom from domination by authorities. Stenner and Haidt regard such authoritarian waves as a feature of liberal democracies noting that the findings of their 2016 study of Trump and Brexit supporters was not unexpected, as they wrote: 

Author and authoritarianism critic Masha Gessen contrasted the "democratic" strategy of the Republican establishment making policy arguments appealing to the public, with the "autocratic" strategy of appealing to an "audience of one" in Donald Trump. Gessen noted the fear of Republicans that Trump would endorse a primary election opponent or otherwise use his political power to undermine any fellow party members that he felt had betrayed him.

The 2020 Republican Party platform simply endorsed "the President's America-first agenda", prompting comparisons to contemporary leader-focused party platforms in Russia and China.

Nostalgia and male bravado 
Nostalgia is a staple of American politics but according to Philip Gorski, Trumpian nostalgia is novel because among other things "it severs the traditional connection between greatness and virtue." In the traditional "Puritan narrative, moral decline precedes material and political decline, and a return to the law must precede any return to greatness. ... Not so in Trump's version of nostalgia. In this narrative, decline is brought about by docility and femininity and the return to greatness requires little more than a reassertion of dominance and masculinity. In this way, 'virtue' is reduced to its root etymology of manly bravado." In studies of the men who would become Trump supporters Michael Kimmel describes the nostalgia of male entitlement felt by men who despaired "over whether or not anything could enable them to find a place with some dignity in this new, multicultural, and more egalitarian world. ... These men were angry, but they all looked back nostalgically to a time when their sense of masculine entitlement went unchallenged. They wanted to reclaim their country, restore their rightful place in it, and retrieve their manhood in the process."

The term that describes the behavior of Kimmel's angry white males is toxic masculinity and according to William Liu, editor of the journal Psychology of Men and Masculinity, it applies especially to Trump. Kimmel was surprised at the sexual turn the 2016 election took and thinks that Trump is for many men a fantasy figure, an uber-male completely free to indulge every desire. "Many of these guys feel that the current order of things has emasculated them, by which I mean it has taken away their ability to support a family and have great life. Here's a guy who says: 'I can build anything I want. I can do anything I want. I can have the women I want.' They're going, 'This guy is awesome!'"

Social psychologists Theresa Vescio and Nathaniel Schermerhorn note that "In his 2016 presidential campaign, Trump embodied HM [hegemonic masculinity] while waxing nostalgic for a racially homogenous past that maintained an unequal gender order. Trump performed HM by repeatedly referencing his status as a successful businessman ("blue-collar businessman") and alluding to how tough he would be as president. Further contributing to his enactment of HM, Trump was openly hostile toward gender-atypical women, sexualized gender typical women, and attacked the masculinity of male peers and opponents." In their studies involving 2007 people, they found that endorsement of hegemonic masculinity better predicted support for Trump than other factors, such as support for antiestablishment, antielitist, nativist, racist, sexist, homophobic or xenophobic perspectives.

Neville Hoad, an expert on gender issues in South Africa, sees this as a common theme with another strongman leader, Jacob Zuma, comparing his "Zulu Big Man version of toxic masculinity versus a dog whistle white supremacist version; the putative real estate billionaire turned reality television star". Both authoritarian leaders are figureheads living the "masculinist fantasy of freedom" supporters dream of, a dream bound to national mythologies of the good life. According to Hoad, one description of this symbolism comes from Jacques Lacan who describes the supremely masculine mythic leader of the primal horde whose power to satisfy every pleasure or whim has not been castrated. By activating such fantasies, toxic masculine behaviors from opulent displays of greed (the dream palaces of Mar-a-Lago and Nkandla), violent rhetoric, "grab them by the pussy" "locker room" "jokes" to misogynist insults, philandering, and even sexual predatory behavior including allegations of groping and raping become political assets not liabilities.

Gender role scholar Colleen Clemens describes this toxic masculinity as "a narrow and repressive description of manhood, designating manhood as defined by violence, sex, status and aggression. It's the cultural ideal of manliness, where strength is everything while emotions are a weakness; where sex and brutality are yardsticks by which men are measured, while supposedly 'feminine' traits—which can range from emotional vulnerability to simply not being hypersexual—are the means by which your status as "man" can be taken away." Writing in the Journal of Human Rights, Kimberly Theidon notes the COVID-19 pandemic's irony of Trumpian toxic masculinity: "Being a tough guy means wearing the mask of masculinity: Being a tough guy means refusing to don a mask that might preserve one's life and the lives of others." 

Tough guy bravado appeared on the internet prior to attack on Congress on January 6, 2021, with one poster writing, "Be ready to fight. Congress needs to hear glass breaking, doors being kicked in ... . Get violent. Stop calling this a march, or rally, or a protest. Go there ready for war. We get our President or we die." Of the rioters arrested for the attack on the U.S. Capitol, 88% were men, and 67% were 35 years or older.

Christian Trumpism 

According to 2016 election exit polls, 26% of voters self identified as white evangelical Christians, of whom more than three-fourths in 2017 approved of Trump's performance, most of them approving "very strongly" as reported by a Pew Research Center study. In contrast, approximately two-thirds of non-white evangelicals supported Hillary Clinton in 2016, with 90% of black Protestants also voting for her even though their theological views are similar to evangelicals. According to Yale researcher Philip Gorski, "the question is not so much why evangelicals voted for Trump then—many did not—but why so many white evangelicals did." Gorski's answer to why Trump, and not an orthodox evangelical was the first choice among white evangelicals was simply "because they are also white Christian nationalists and Trumpism is inter alia a reactionary version of white Christian nationalism." 

Israeli philosopher Adi Ophir sees the politics of purity in the white Christian nationalist rhetoric of evangelical supporters, such as the comparison of Nehemiah's wall around Jerusalem to Trump's wall keeping out the enemy, writing, "the notion of the enemy includes 'Mexican migrants', 'filthy' gays, and even Catholics 'led astray by Satan', and the real danger these enemies pose is degradation to a 'blessed—great— ... nation' whose God is the Lord."

Theologian Michael Horton believes Christian Trumpism represents the confluence of three trends that have come together, namely Christian American exceptionalism, end-times conspiracy, and the prosperity gospel, with Christian Americanism being the narrative that God specially called the United States into being as an extraordinary if not miraculous providence and end-times conspiracy referring to the world's annihilation (figurative or literal) due to some conspiracy of nefarious groups and globalist powers threatening American sovereignty. Horton thinks that what he calls the "cult of Christian Trumpism" blends these three ingredients with "a generous dose of hucksterism" as well as self-promotion and personality cult. 

Evangelical Christian and historian John Fea believes "the church has warned against the pursuit of political power for a long, long time," but that many modern day evangelicals such as Trump advisor and televangelist Paula White ignore these admonitions. Televangelist Jim Bakker praises prosperity gospel preacher White's ability to "walk into the White House at any time she wants to" and have "full access to the King." According to Fea, there are several other "court evangelicals" who have "devoted their careers to endorsing political candidates and Supreme Court justices who will restore what they believe to be the Judeo-Christian roots of the country" and who in turn are called on by Trump to "explain to their followers why Trump can be trusted in spite of his moral failings", including James Dobson, Franklin Graham, Johnnie Moore Jr., Ralph Reed, Gary Bauer, Richard Land, megachurch pastor Mark Burns and Southern Baptist pastor and Fox political commentator Robert Jeffress. 

For prominent Christians who fail to support Trump, the cost is not a simple loss of presidential access but a substantial risk of a firestorm of criticism and backlash, a lesson learned by Timothy Dalrymple, president of the flagship magazine of evangelicals Christianity Today, and former chief editor Mark Galli, who were condemned by more than two hundred evangelical leaders for co-authoring a letter arguing that Christians were obligated to support the impeachment of Trump.

Historian Stephen Jaeger traces the history of admonitions against becoming beholden religious courtiers back to the 11th century, with warnings of curses placed on holy men barred from heaven for taking too "keen an interest in the affairs of the state." Dangers to the court clergy were described by Peter of Blois, a 12th-century French cleric, theologian and courtier who "knew that court life is the death of the soul" and that despite participation at court being known to them to be "contrary to God and salvation," the clerical courtiers whitewashed it with a multitude of justifications such as biblical references of Moses being sent by God to the Pharaoh. Pope Pius II opposed the clergy's presence at court, believing it was very difficult for a Christian courtier to "rein in ambition, suppress avarice, tame envy, strife, wrath, and cut off vice, while standing in the midst of these [very] things." The ancient history of such warnings of the dark corrupting influence of power over holy leaders is recounted by Fea who directly compares it to behavior of Trump's court evangelical leaders, warning that Christians are "in jeopardy of making idols out of political leaders by placing our sacred hopes in them."

Jeffress claims that evangelical leaders' support of Trump is moral regardless of behavior that Christianity Todays chief editor called "a near perfect example of a human being who is morally lost and confused." Jeffress argues that "the godly principle here is that governments have one responsibility, and that is Romans 13 [which] says to avenge evil doers." This same biblical chapter was used by Jeff Sessions to claim biblical justification for Trump's policy of separating children from immigrant families. Historian Lincoln Muller explains this is one of two types of interpretations of Romans 13 which has been used in American political debates since its founding and is on the side of "the thread of American history that justifies oppression and domination in the name of law and order." 

From Jeffress's reading, government's purpose is as a "strongman to protect its citizens against evildoers", adding: "I don't care about that candidate's tone or vocabulary, I want the meanest toughest son a you-know-what I can find, and I believe that is biblical." Jeffress, who referred to Barack Obama as "paving the way for the future reign of the Antichrist," Mitt Romney as a cult follower of a non-Christian religion and Roman Catholicism as a "Satanic" result of "Babylonian mystery religion" traces the Christian libertarian perspective on government's sole role to suppress evil back to Saint Augustine who argued in The City of God against the Pagans (426 CE) that government's role is to restrain evil so Christians can peacefully practice their beliefs. Martin Luther similarly believed that government should be limited to checking sin.

Like Jeffress, Richard Land refused to cut ties with Trump after his reaction to the Charlottesville white supremacist rally, with the explanation that "Jesus did not turn away from those who may have seemed brash with their words or behavior," adding that "now is not the time to quit or retreat, but just the opposite—to lean in closer." Johnnie Moore's explanation for refusing to repudiate Trump after his Charlottesville response was that "you only make a difference if you have a seat at the table." Trinity Forum fellow Peter Wehner warns that "[t]he perennial danger facing Christians is seduction and self-delusion. That's what's happening in the Trump era. The president is using evangelical leaders to shield himself from criticism." 

Evangelical biblical scholar Ben Witherington believes Trump's evangelical apologists' defensive use of the tax collector comparison is false and that retaining a "seat at the table" is supportable only if the Christian leader is admonishing the President to reverse course, explaining that "[t]he sinners and tax collectors were not political officials, so there is no analogy there. Besides, Jesus was not giving the sinners and tax collectors political advice—he was telling them to repent! If that's what evangelical leaders are doing with our President, and telling him when his politics are un-Christian, and explaining to him that racism is an enormous sin and there is no moral equivalency between the two sides in Charlottesville, then well and good. Otherwise, they are complicit with the sins of our leaders."

Evangelical Bible studies author Beth Moore joins in criticism of the perspective of Trump's evangelicals, writing: "I have never seen anything in these United States of America I found more astonishingly seductive and dangerous to the saints of God than Trumpism. This Christian nationalism is not of God. Move back from it." Moore warns that "we will be held responsible for remaining passive in this day of seduction to save our own skin while the saints we've been entrusted to serve are being seduced, manipulated, USED and stirred up into a lather of zeal devoid of the Holy Spirit for political gain." Moore's view is that "[w]e can't sanctify idolatry by labeling a leader our Cyrus. We need no Cyrus. We have a king. His name is Jesus." 

Other prominent white evangelicals have taken Bible based stands against Trump, such as Peter Wehner of the conservative Ethics and Public Policy Center and Russell D. Moore president of the public policy arm of the Southern Baptist Convention. Wehner describes Trump's theology as embodying "a Nietzschean morality rather than a Christian one," that evangelicals' "support for Trump comes at a high cost for Christian witness," and that "Trump's most enduring legacy [may be] a nihilistic political culture, one that is tribalistic, distrustful, and sometimes delusional, swimming in conspiracy theories." Moore sharply distanced himself from Trump's racial rhetoric stating, "The Bible speaks so directly to these issues," and, "that, really, in order to avoid questions of racial unity, one has to evade the Bible itself."

Presbyterian minister and Pulitzer Prize–winning author Chris Hedges thinks many of Trump's white evangelical supporters resemble those of the German Christians movement of 1930s Germany who also regarded their leader in an idolatrous way, the Christo-fascist idea of a Volk messiah, a leader who would act as an instrument of God to restore their country from moral depravity to greatness. Also rejecting the idolatry, John Fea said "Trump takes everything that Jesus taught, especially in the Sermon on the Mount, throws it out the window, exchanges it for a mess of pottage called 'Make America Great Again', and from a Christian perspective for me, that borders on—no, it is a form of idolatry."

Theologian Greg Boyd challenges the religious right's politicization of Christianity, and the Christian nationalist theory of American exceptionalism, charging that "a significant segment of American evangelicalism is guilty of nationalistic and political idolatry." Boyd compares the cause of "taking America back for God" and policies to force Christian values through political coercion to the aspiration in first century Israel to "take Israel back for God" which caused followers to attempt to fit Jesus into the role of a political messiah. Boyd argues that Jesus declined, demonstrating that "God's mode of operation in the world was no longer going to be nationalistic." 

Boyd asks to consider Christ's example, asking questions such as whether Jesus ever suggested by word or example that Christians should aspire to gaining power in the reigning government of the day, or whether he advocated using civil laws to change the behavior of sinners. Like Fea, Boyd states he is not making the argument of passive political non involvement, writing that "of course our political views will be influenced by our Christian faith" but rather that we must embrace humility and not "christen our views as 'the' Christian view". This humility in Boyd's view requires Christians to reject social domination, the "'power over' others to acquire and secure these things", and that "the only way we individually and collectively represent the kingdom of God is through loving, Christ like, sacrificial acts of service to others. Anything and everything else, however good and noble, lies outside the kingdom of God." 

Horton thinks that rather than engage in what he calls the cult of "Christian Trumpism", Christians should reject turning the "saving gospel into a worldly power", while Fea thinks the Christian response to Trump should instead be those used in the civil rights movement, namely preaching hope not fear; humility, not power to socially dominate others; and responsible reading of history as in Martin Luther King Jr.'s Letter from Birmingham Jail rather than nostalgia for a prior American Christian utopia that never was.

Conservative orthodox Christian writer Rod Dreher and theologian Michael Horton have argued that participants in the Jericho March were engaging in "Trump worship", akin to idolatry. In the National Review, Cameron Hilditch described the movement as:  Emma Green in The Atlantic blamed pro-Trump, evangelical white Christians and the Jericho March participants for the storming of the Capitol building on January 6, 2021, saying: "The mob carried signs and flag declaring Jesus Saves! and God, Guns & Guts Made America, Let's Keep All Three."

Methods of persuasion 

Sociologist Arlie Hochschild thinks emotional themes in Trump's rhetoric are fundamental, writing that his "speeches—evoking dominance, bravado, clarity, national pride, and personal uplift—inspire an emotional transformation," deeply resonating with their "emotional self-interest". Hochschild's perspective is that Trump is best understood as an "emotions candidate", arguing that comprehending the emotional self-interests of voters explains the paradox of the success of such politicians raised by Thomas Frank's book What's the Matter with Kansas?, an anomaly which motivated her five-year immersive research into the emotional dynamics of the Tea Party movement which she believes has mutated into Trumpism. 

The book resulting from her research, Strangers in Their Own Land, was named one of the "6 books to understand Trump's Win" by the New York Times. Hochschild claims it is wrong for progressives to assume that well educated individuals have mainly been persuaded by political rhetoric to vote against their rational self interest through appeals to the "bad angels" of their nature: "their greed, selfishness, racial intolerance, homophobia, and desire to get out of paying taxes that go to the unfortunate." She grants that the appeal to bad angels are made by Trump, but that it "obscures another—to the right wing's good angels—their patience in waiting in line in scary economic times, their capacity for loyalty, sacrifice, and endurance", qualities she describes as a part of a motivating narrative she calls their "deep story", a social contract narrative that appears to be widely shared in other countries as well. She thinks Trump's approach towards his audience creates group cohesiveness among his followers by exploiting a crowd phenomenon Emile Durkheim called "collective effervescence", "a state of emotional excitation felt by those who join with others they take to be fellow members of a moral or biological tribe ... to affirm their unity and, united, they feel secure and respected." 

Rhetorically, Trumpism employs absolutist framings and threat narratives characterized by a rejection of the political establishment. The absolutist rhetoric emphasizes non-negotiable boundaries and moral outrage at their supposed violation. The rhetorical pattern within a Trump rally is common for authoritarian movements. First, elicit a sense of depression, humiliation and victimhood. Second, separate the world into two opposing groups: a relentlessly demonized set of others versus those who have the power and will to overcome them. This involves vividly identifying the enemy supposedly causing the current state of affairs and then promoting paranoid conspiracy theories and fearmongering to inflame fear and anger. After cycling these first two patterns through the populace, the final message aim to produce a cathartic release of pent-up ochlocracy and mob energy, with a promise that salvation is at hand because there is a powerful leader who will deliver the nation back to its former glory.

This three-part pattern was first identified in 1932 by Roger Money-Kyrle and later published in his Psychology of Propaganda. A constant barrage of sensationalistic rhetoric serves to rivet media attention while achieving multiple political objectives, not the least of which is that it serves to obscure actions such as profound neoliberal deregulation. One study gives the example that significant environmental deregulation occurred during the first year of the Trump administration due to its concurrent use of spectacular racist rhetoric but escaped much media attention. According to the authors, this served political objectives of dehumanizing its targets, eroding democratic norms, and consolidating power by emotionally connecting with and inflaming resentments among the base of followers but most importantly served to distract media attention from deregulatory policymaking by igniting intense media coverage of the distractions, precisely due to their radically transgressive nature.

Trump's skill with personal branding allowed him to effectively market himself as the Money-Kyrle extraordinary leader by leveraging his celebrity status and name recognition. As one of the communications director for the MAGA super PAC put it in 2016, "Like Hercules, Donald Trump is a work of fiction." Journalism professor Mark Danner explains that "week after week for a dozen years millions of Americans saw Donald J. Trump portraying the business magus [in The Apprentice], the grand vizier of capitalism, the wise man of the boardroom, a living confection whose every step and word bespoke gravitas and experience and power and authority and ... money. Endless amounts of money." 

Political science scholar Andrea Schneiker regards the heavily promoted Trump public persona as that of a superhero, a genius but still "an ordinary citizen that, in case of an emergency, uses his superpowers to save others, that is, his country. He sees a problem, knows what has to be done in order to solve it, has the ability to fix the situation and does so. According to the branding strategy of Donald Trump ... a superhero is needed to solve the problems of ordinary Americans and the nation as such, because politicians are not able to do so. Hence, the superhero per definition is an anti-politician. Due to his celebrity status and his identity as entertainer, Donald Trump can thereby be considered to be allowed to take extraordinary measures and even to break rules."

According to civil rights lawyer Burt Neuborne and political theorist William E. Connolly, Trumpist rhetoric employs tropes similar to those used by fascists in Germany to persuade citizens (at first a minority) to give up democracy, by using a barrage of falsehoods, half-truths, personal invective, threats, xenophobia, national-security scares, religious bigotry, white racism, exploitation of economic insecurity, and a never-ending search for scapegoats. Neuborne found twenty parallel practices, such as creating what amounts to an "alternate reality" in adherents' minds, through direct communications, by nurturing a fawning mass media and by deriding scientists to erode the notion of objective truth; organizing carefully orchestrated mass rallies; bitterly attacking judges when legal cases are lost or rejected; using an uninterrupted stream of lies, half-truths, insults, vituperation and innuendo designed to marginalize, demonize and eventually destroy opponents; making jingoistic appeals to ultranationalist fervor; and promising to slow, stop and even reverse the flow of "undesirable" ethnic groups who are cast as scapegoats for the nation's ills.

Connolly presents a similar list in his book Aspirational Fascism (2017), adding comparisons of the integration of theatrics and crowd participation with rhetoric, involving grandiose bodily gestures, grimaces, hysterical charges, dramatic repetitions of alternate reality falsehoods, and totalistic assertions incorporated into signature phrases that audiences are strongly encouraged to join in chanting. Despite the similarities, Connolly stresses that Trump is no Nazi but "is rather, an aspirational fascist who pursues crowd adulation, hyperaggressive nationalism, white triumphalism, and militarism, pursues a law-and-order regime giving unaccountable power to the police, and is a practitioner of a rhetorical style that regularly creates fake news and smears opponents to mobilize support for the Big Lies he advances."

Reporting on the crowd dynamics of Trumpist rallies has documented expressions of the Money-Kyrle pattern and associated stagecraft, with some comparing the symbiotic dynamics of crowd pleasing to that of the sports entertainment style of events which Trump was involved with since the 1980s. Critical theory scholar Douglas Kellner compares the elaborate staging of Leni Riefenstahl's Triumph of the Will with that used with Trump supporters using the example of the preparation of photo op sequences and aggressive hyping of huge attendance expected for Trump's 2015 primary event in Mobile, Alabama, when the media coverage repeatedly cuts between the Trump jet circling the stadium, the rising excitement of rapturous admirers below, the motorcade and the final triumphal entrance of the individual Kellner claims is being presented as the "political savior to help them out with their problems and address their grievances". 

Connolly thinks the performance draws energy from the crowd's anger as it channels it, drawing it into a collage of anxieties, frustrations and resentments about malaise themes, such as deindustrialization, offshoring, racial tensions, political correctness, a more humble position for the United States in global security, economics and so on. Connolly observes that animated gestures, pantomiming, facial expressions, strutting and finger pointing are incorporated as part of the theater, transforming the anxiety into anger directed at particular targets, concluding that "each element in a Trump performance flows and folds into the others until an aggressive resonance machine is formed that is more intense than its parts."

Some academics point out that the narrative common in the popular press describing the psychology of such crowds is a repetition of a 19th-century theory by Gustave Le Bon when organized crowds were seen by political elites as potentially anarchic threats to the social order. In his book The Crowd: A Study of the Popular Mind (1895), Le Bon described a sort of collective contagion uniting a crowd into a near religious frenzy, reducing members to barbaric, if not subhuman levels of consciousness with mindless anarchic goals. Since such a description depersonalizes supporters, this type of Le Bon analysis is criticized because the would-be defenders of liberal democracy simultaneously are dodging responsibility for investigating grievances while also unwittingly accepting the same us vs. them framing of illiberalism. Connolly acknowledges the risks but considers it more risky to ignore that Trumpian persuasion is successful due to deliberate use of techniques evoking more mild forms of affective contagion.

Falsehoods 

The absolutist rhetoric employed heavily favors crowd reaction over veracity, with a large number of falsehoods which Trump presents as facts. Drawing on Harry G. Frankfurt's book On Bullshit, political science professor Matthew McManus points out that it is more precise to identify Trump as a bullshitter whose sole interest is to persuade, and not a liar (e.g. Richard Nixon) who takes the power of truth seriously and so deceitfully attempts to conceal it. Trump by contrast is indifferent to the truth or unaware of it. Unlike conventional lies of politicians exaggerating their accomplishments, Trump's lies are egregious, making lies about easily verifiable facts. At one rally Trump stated his father "came from Germany", even though Fred Trump was born in New York City.

Trump is surprised when his falsehoods are contradicted, as was the case when leaders at the 2018 United Nations General Assembly burst into laughter at his boast that he had accomplished more in his first two years than any other United States president. Visibly startled, Trump responded to the audience: "I didn't expect that reaction." Trump lies about the trivial, such as claiming that there was no rain on the day of his inauguration when in fact it did rain, as well as making grandiose "Big Lies," such as claiming that Obama founded ISIS, or promoting the birther movement, a conspiracy theory which claims that Obama was born in Kenya, not Hawaii. Connolly points to the similarities of such reality-bending gaslighting with fascist and post Soviet techniques of propaganda including Kompromat (scandalous material), stating that "Trumpian persuasion draws significantly upon the repetition of Big Lies."

More combative, less ideological base 
Journalist Elaina Plott suggests ideology is not as important as other characteristics of Trumpism. Plott cites political analyst Jeff Roe, who observed Trump "understood" and acted on the trend among Republican voters to be "less ideological" but "more polarized". Republicans are now more willing to accept policies like government mandated health care coverage for pre-existing conditions or trade tariffs, formerly disdained by conservatives as burdensome government regulations. At the same time, strong avowals of support for Trump and aggressive partisanship have become part of Republican election campaigning—in at least some parts of America—reaching down even to non-partisan campaigns for local government which formerly were collegial and issue-driven. Research by political scientist Marc Hetherington and others has found Trump supporters tend to share a "worldview" transcending political ideology, agreeing with statements like "the best strategy is to play hardball, even if it means being unfair." In contrast, those who agree with statements like "cooperation is the key to success" tend to prefer Trump's adversary former Republican presidential candidate Mitt Romney.

On January 31, 2021, a detailed overview of the attempt by combative Trump supporters to subvert the election of the United States was published in The New York Times. Journalist Nicholas Lemann writes of the disconnect between some of Trump's campaign rhetoric and promises, and what he accomplished once in office—and the fact that the difference seemed to bother very few supporters. The campaign themes being anti-free-trade nationalism, defense of Social Security, attacks on big business, "building that big, beautiful wall and making Mexico pay for it", repealing Obama's Affordable Care Act, a trillion dollar infrastructure-building program. The accomplishments being "conventional" Republican policies and legislation—substantial tax cuts, rollbacks of federal regulations, and increases in military spending. Many have noted that instead of the Republican National Convention issuing the customary "platform" of policies and promises for the 2020 campaign, it offered a "one-page resolution" stating that the party was not "going to have a new platform, but instead ... 'has and will continue to enthusiastically support the president's America-first agenda.'"

An alternate nonideological circular definition of Trumpism widely held among Trump activists was reported by Saagar Enjeti, chief Washington correspondent for The Hill, who stated: "I was frequently told by people wholly within the MAGA camp that trumpism meant anything Trump does, ergo nothing that he did is a departure from trumpism."

Ideological themes 
Trumpism differs from classical Abraham Lincoln Republicanism in many ways regarding free trade, immigration, equality, checks and balances in federal government, and the separation of church and state. Peter J. Katzenstein of the WZB Berlin Social Science Center believes that Trumpism rests on three pillars, namely nationalism, religion and race. According to Jeff Goodwin, Trumpism is characterized by five key elements: social conservatism, neoliberal capitalism, economic nationalism, nativism, and white nationalism.

At the 2021 CPAC conference, Trump gave his own definition of what defines Trumpism: "What it means is great deals, ... . Like the USMCA replacement of the horrible NAFTA. ... It means low taxes and eliminated job killing regulations, ... . It means strong borders, but people coming into our country based on a system of merit. ... [I]t means no riots in the streets. It means law enforcement. It means very strong protection for the second amendment and the right to keep and bear arms. ... [I]t means a strong military and taking care of our vets ... ."

Social psychology

Dominance orientation 

Social psychology research into the Trump movement, such as that of Bob Altemeyer, Thomas F. Pettigrew, and Karen Stenner, views the Trump movement as primarily being driven by the psychological predispositions of its followers. Altemeyer and other researchers such as Pettigrew emphasize that no claim is made that these factors provide a complete explanation, mentioning other research showing that important political and historical factors (reviewed elsewhere in this article) are also involved. The academic peer-reviewed journal Social Psychological and Personality Science published the article "Group-Based Dominance and Authoritarian Aggression Predict Support for Donald Trump in the 2016 U.S. Presidential Election", describing a study concluding that Trump followers have a distinguishing preference for strongly hierarchical and ethnocentric social orders that favor their in-group. 

In a non-academic book which he co-authored with John Dean entitled Authoritarian Nightmare: Trump and His Followers, Altemeyer describes research which reaches the same conclusions. Despite disparate and inconsistent beliefs and ideologies, a coalition of such followers can become cohesive and broad in part because each individual "compartmentalizes" their thoughts and they are free to define their sense of the threatened tribal in-group in their own terms, whether it is predominantly related to their cultural or religious views (e.g. the mystery of evangelical support for Trump), nationalism (e.g. the Make America Great Again slogan), or their race (maintaining a white majority).

Altemeyer, MacWilliams, Feldman, Choma, Hancock, Van Assche and Pettigrew claim that instead of directly attempting to measure such ideological, racial or policy views, supporters of such movements can be reliably predicted by using two social psychology scales (singly or in combination), namely right-wing authoritarian (RWA) measures which were developed in the 1980s by Altemeyer and other authoritarian personality researchers, and the social dominance orientation (SDO) scale developed in the 1990s by social dominance theorists. 

In May 2019, Monmouth University Polling Institute conducted a study in collaboration with Altemeyer in order to empirically test the hypothesis using the SDO and RWA measures. The finding was that social dominance orientation and affinity for authoritarian leadership are highly correlated with followers of Trumpism. Altemeyer's perspective and his use of an authoritarian scale and SDO to identify Trump followers is not uncommon. His study was a further confirmation of the earlier mentioned studies discussed in MacWilliams (2016), Feldman (2020), Choma and Hancock (2017), and Van Assche & Pettigrew (2016).

The research does not imply that the followers always behave in an authoritarian manner but that expression is contingent, which means there is reduced influence if it is not triggered by fear and what the subject perceives as threats. The research is global and similar social psychological techniques for analyzing Trumpism have demonstrated their effectiveness at identifying adherents of similar movements in Europe, including those Belgium and France (Lubbers & Scheepers, 2002; Swyngedouw & Giles, 2007; Van Hiel & Mervielde, 2002; Van Hiel, 2012), the Netherlands (Cornelis & Van Hiel, 2014) and Italy (Leone, Desimoni & Chirumbolo, 2014). Quoting comments from participants in a series of focus groups made up of people who had voted for Democrat Obama in 2012 but flipped to Trump in 2016, pollster Diane Feldman noted the anti-government, anti-coastal-elite anger: "'They think they're better than us, they're P.C., they're virtue-signallers.' '[Trump] doesn't come across as one of those people who think they're better than us and are screwing us.' 'They lecture us.' 'They don't even go to church.' 'They're in charge, and they're ripping us off.'"

Basis in animal behavior 
Former speaker of the House Newt Gingrich explained the central role of dominance in his speech "Principles of Trumpism", comparing the needed leadership style to that of a violent bear. Psychology researcher Dan P. McAdams thinks a better comparison is to the dominance behavior of alpha male chimpanzees such as Yeroen, the subject of an extensive study of chimp social behavior conducted by renowned primatologist Frans de Waal. Christopher Boehm, a professor of biology and anthropology agrees, writing, "his model of political posturing has echoes of what I saw in the wild in six years in Tanzania studying the Gombe chimpanzees," and "seems like a classic alpha display."

Using the example of Yeroen, McAdams describes the similarities: "On Twitter, Trump's incendiary tweets are like Yeroen's charging displays. In chimp colonies, the alpha male occasionally goes berserk and starts screaming, hooting, and gesticulating wildly as he charges toward other males nearby. Pandemonium ensues as rival males cower in fear ... Once the chaos ends, there is a period of peace and order, wherein rival males pay homage to the alpha, visiting him, grooming him, and expressing various forms of submission. In Trump's case, his tweets are designed to intimidate his foes and rally his submissive base ... These verbal outbursts reinforce the president's dominance by reminding everybody of his wrath and his force."

Primatologist Dame Jane Goodall explains that like the dominance performances of Trump, "In order to impress rivals, males seeking to rise in the dominance hierarchy perform spectacular displays: Stamping, slapping the ground, dragging branches, throwing rocks. The more vigorous and imaginative the display, the faster the individual is likely to rise in the hierarchy, and the longer he is likely to maintain that position." The comparison has been echoed by political observers sympathetic to Trump. Nigel Farage, an enthusiastic backer of Trump, stated that in the 2016 United States presidential debates where Trump loomed up on Clinton, he "looked like a big silverback gorilla", and added that "he is that big alpha male. The leader of the pack!"

McAdams points out the audience gets to vicariously share in the sense of dominance due to the parasocial bonding that his performance produces for his fans, as shown by Shira Gabriel's research studying the phenomenon in Trump's role in The Apprentice. McAdams writes that the "television audience vicariously experienced the world according to Donald Trump", a world where Trump says "Man is the most vicious of all animals, and life is a series of battles ending in victory or defeat."

Collective narcissism 

Cultural anthropologist Paul Stoller thinks Trump masterfully employed the fundamentals of celebrity culture-glitz, illusion and fantasy to construct a shared alternate reality where lies become truth and reality's resistance to one's own dreams are overcome by the right attitude and bold self-confidence. Trump's father indoctrinated his children from an early age into the sort of positive thinking approach to reality advocated by the family's pastor Norman Vincent Peale. Trump boasted that Peale considered him the greatest student of his philosophy that regards facts as not important, because positive attitudes will instead cause what you "image" to materialize. Trump biographer Gwenda Blair thinks Trump took Peale's self-help philosophy and "weaponized it".

Robert Jay Lifton, a scholar of psychohistory and authority on the nature of cults, emphasizes the importance of understanding Trumpism "as an assault on reality". A leader has more power if he is in any part successful at making truth irrelevant to his followers. Trump biographer Timothy L. O'Brien agrees, stating: "It is a core operating principle of Trumpism. If you constantly attack objective reality, you are left as the only trustworthy source of information, which is one of his goals for his relationship with his supporters—that they should believe no one else but him." Lifton believes Trump is a purveyor of a solipsistic reality which is hostile to facts and is made collective by amplifying frustrations and fears held by his community of zealous believers. 

Social psychologists refer to this as collective narcissism, a commonly held and strong emotional investment in the idea that one's group has a special status in society. It is often accompanied by chronic expressions of intolerance towards out-groups, intergroup aggression and frequent expressions of group victimhood whenever the in-group feels threatened by perceived criticisms or lack of proper respect for the in-group. Identity of group members is closely tied to the collective identity expressed by its leader, motivating multiple studies to examine its relationship to authoritarian movements. Collective narcissism measures have been shown to be a powerful predictor of membership in such movements including Trump's.

In his book Believe Me which details Trump's exploitation of white evangelical politics of fear, Messiah College history professor John Fea points out the narcissistic nature of the fanciful appeals to nostalgia, noting that "In the end, the practice of nostalgia is inherently selfish because it focuses entirely on our own experience of the past and not on the experience of others. For example, people nostalgic for the world of Leave It to Beaver may fail to recognize that other people, perhaps even some of the people living in the Cleaver's suburban "paradise" of the 1950s, were not experiencing the world in a way that they would describe as 'great.' Nostalgia can give us tunnel vision. Its selective use of the past fails to recognize the complexity and breadth of the human experience ... ."

According to Fea, the hopelessness of achieving such fanciful versions of an idealized past "causes us to imagine a future filled with horror" making anything unfamiliar the fodder for conspiratorial narratives that easily mobilize white evangelicals who cannot summon "the kind of spiritual courage necessary to overcome fear." As a result, they not only embrace these fears but are easily captivated by a strongman such as Trump who repeats and amplifies their fears while posing as the deliverer from them. In his review of Fea's analysis of the impact of conspiracy theories on white evangelical Trump supporters, scholar of religious politics David Gutterman writes: "The greater the threat, the more powerful the deliverance." Gutterman's view is that "Donald J. Trump did not invent this formula; evangelicals have, in their lack of spiritual courage, demanded and gloried in this message for generations. Despite the literal biblical reassurance to 'fear not,' white evangelicals are primed for fear, their identity is stoked by fear, and the sources of fear are around every unfamiliar turn.

Social theory scholar John Cash notes that disaster narratives of impending horrors have a broader audience than a single community whose identity is associated with specific collectively held certainties offered by white evangelical leaders, pointing to a 2010 Pew study which found that 41 percent of those in the US think that the world will either definitely or probably be destroyed by the middle of the century. Cash points out that certainties may be found in other narratives which also have the unifying effect of binding like minded individuals into shared "us versus them" narratives such as those based on race or political absolutisms.

Cash notes that all political systems must endure some such exposure to the lure of narcissism, fantasy, illogicality and distortion. Cash thinks that psychoanalytic theorist Joel Whitebook is correct that "Trumpism as a social experience can be understood as a psychotic like phenomenon, that "[Trumpism is] an intentional [...] attack on our relation to reality." Whitebook thinks Trump's playbook is like that of Putin's strategist Vladislav Surkov who employs "ceaseless shapeshifting, appealing to nationalist skinheads one moment and human rights groups the next."

Cash makes comparisons to an Alice in Wonderland world when describing Trump's adept ability to hold a looking glass up to followers with disparate fantasies by seemingly embracing all of them in a series of contradictory tweets and pronouncements. Cash cites examples such as Trump appearing to support and encourage the "very fine people" among the "neo-Nazi protestors [who] carried torches that were clear signifiers of a nostalgia" after Charlottesville or for audiences with felt grievances about America's first black president, conspiracy fantasies such as the claim that Obama wiretapped him. Cash writes: "Unlike the resilient Alice, who, having stepped through the looking-glass, insists on truth and accuracy when confronted by a world of reversals, contradictions, nonsense and irrationality, Trump reverses this process. Captivated by his own image and, hence, both unwilling and unable to step through the looking-glass for fear of disturbing and dissolving that narcissistic fascination with his preferred self-image, Trump has dragged the uninhibited and distorted world of the other side of the looking-glass into our shared world."

Although the leader possesses dominant ownership of the reality shared by the group, Lifton sees important differences between Trumpism and typical cults, such as not advancing a totalist ideology and that isolation from the outside world is not used to preserve group cohesion. Lifton does identify multiple similarities with the kinds of cults disparaging the fake world that outsiders are deluded by in preference for their true reality—a world that transcends the illusions and false information created by the cult's titanic enemies. Persuasion techniques similar to those of cults are used such as indoctrination employing constant echoing of catch phrases (via rally response, retweet, or Facebook share), or in participatory response to the guru's like utterances either in person or in online settings. Examples include the use of call and response ("Clinton" triggers "lock her up"; "immigrants" triggers "build that wall"; "who will pay for it?" triggers "Mexico"), thereby deepening the sense of participation with the transcendent unity between the leader and the community. Participants and observers at rallies have remarked on the special kind of liberating feeling that is often experienced which Lifton calls a "high state" that "can even be called experiences of transcendence".

Conservative culture commentator David Brooks observes that under Trump, this post-truth mindset heavily reliant on conspiracy themes came to dominate Republican identity, providing its believers a sense of superiority since such insiders possess important information most people do not have. This results in an empowering sense of agency with the liberation, entitlement and group duty to reject "experts" and the influence of hidden cabals seeking to dominate them. Social media amplify the power of members to promote and expand their connections with like minded believers in insular alternate reality echo chambers. Social psychology and cognitive science research shows that individuals seek information and communities that confirm their views and that even those with critical thinking skills sufficient to identify false claims with non political material cannot do so when interpreting factual material that does not conform to political beliefs. 

While such media-enabled departures from shared, fact-based reality dates at least as far back as 1439 with the appearance of the Gutenberg press, what is new about social media is the personal bond created through direct and instantaneous communications from the leader, and the constant opportunity to repeat the messages and participate in the group identity signaling behavior. Prior to 2015, Trump already had firmly established this kind of parasocial bond with a substantial base of followers due to his repeated television and media appearances. For those sharing political views similar to his, Trump's use of Twitter to share his conspiratorial views caused those emotional bonds to intensify, causing his supporters to feel a deepened empathetic bond as with a friend—sharing his anger, sharing his moral outrage, taking pride in his successes, sharing in his denial of failures and his oftentimes conspiratorial views.

Given their effectiveness as an emotional tool, Brooks thinks such sharing of conspiracy theories has become the most powerful community bonding mechanism of the 21st century. Conspiracy theories usually have a strong political component and books such as Hofstadter's The Paranoid Style in American Politics describe the political efficacy of these alternate takes on reality. Some attribute Trump's political success to making such narratives a regular staple of Trumpist rhetoric, such as the purported rigging of the 2016 election to defeat Trump, that climate change is a hoax perpetrated by the Chinese, that Obama was not born in the United States, multiple conspiracy theories about the Clintons, that vaccines cause autism and so on. One of the most popular though disproven and discredited conspiracy theories is QAnon, which asserts that top Democrats run an elite child sex-trafficking ring and President Trump is making efforts to dismantle it. An October 2020 Yahoo-YouGov poll showed that these QAnon claims are mainstream, not fringe beliefs among Trump supporters, with both elements of the theory said to be true by fully half of Trump supporters polled.

Some social psychologists see the predisposition of Trumpists towards interpreting social interactions in terms of dominance frameworks as extending to their relationship towards facts. A study by Felix Sussenbach and Adam B. Moore found that the dominance motive strongly correlated with hostility towards disconfirming facts and affinity for conspiracies among 2016 Trump voters but not among Clinton voters. Many critics note Trump's skill in exploiting narrative, emotion, and a whole host of rhetorical ploys to draw supporters into the group's common adventure as characters in a story much bigger than themselves. 

It is a story that involves not just a community-building call to arms to defeat titanic threats, or of the leader's heroic deeds restoring American greatness, but of a restoration of each supporter's individual sense of liberty and power to control their lives. Trump channels and amplifies these aspirations, explaining in one of his books that his bending of the truth is effective because it plays to people's greatest fantasies. By contrast, Clinton was dismissive of such emotion-filled storytelling and ignored the emotional dynamics of the Trumpist narrative.

Media and pillarization

Culture industry 

Peter E. Gordon, Alex Ross, sociologist David L. Andrews and Harvard political theorist David Lebow look on Theodor Adorno and Max Horkheimer's concept of the "culture industry" as useful for comprehending Trumpism. As Ross explains the concept, the culture industry replicates "fascist methods of mass hypnosis ... blurring the line between reality and fiction," claiming, "Trump is as much a pop-culture phenomenon as he is a political one." Gordon observes that these purveyors of popular culture are not just leveraging outrage, but are turning politics into a more commercially lucrative product, a "polarized, standardized reflection of opinion into forms of humor and theatricalized outrage within narrow niche markets ... within which one swoons to one's preferred slogan and already knows what one knows. Name just about any political position and what sociologists call pillarization—or what the Frankfurt School called "ticket" thinking—will predict, almost without fail, a full suite of opinions. 

Trumpism is from Lebow's perspective, more of a result of this process than a cause. In the intervening years since Adorno's work, Lebow believes the culture industry has evolved into a politicizing culture market "based increasingly on the internet, constituting a self-referential hyperreality shorn from any reality of referants ... sensationalism and insulation intensify intolerance of dissonance and magnify hostility against alternative hyperrealities. In a self-reinforcing logic of escalation, intolerance and hostility further encourage sensationalism and the retreat into insularity." From Gordon's view, "Trumpism itself, one could argue, is just another name for the culture industry, where the performance of undoing repression serves as a means for carrying on precisely as before."

From this viewpoint, the susceptibility to psychological manipulation of individuals with social dominance inclinations is not at the center of Trumpism, but is instead the "culture industry" which exploits these and other susceptibilities by using mechanisms that condition people to think in standardized ways. The burgeoning culture industry respects no political boundaries as it develops these markets with Gordon emphasizing "This is true on the left as well as the right, and it is especially noteworthy once we countenance what passes for political discourse today. Instead of a public sphere, we have what Jürgen Habermas long ago called the refeudalization of society."

What Kreiss calls an "identity-based account of media" is important for understanding Trump's success because "citizens understand politics and accept information through the lens of partisan identity. ... The failure to come to grips with a socially embedded public and an identity group–based democracy has placed significant limits on our ability to imagine a way forward for journalism and media in the Trump era. As Fox News and Breitbart have discovered, there is power in the claim of representing and working for particular publics, quite apart from any abstract claims to present the truth."

Profitability of spectacle and outrage 

Examining trumpism as an entertainment product, some media research focuses on the heavy reliance on outrage discourse which in terms of media coverage privileged Trump's rhetoric over that of other candidates due to the symbiotic relationship between his focus on the entertainment value of such storytelling and the commercial interests of media companies. A unique form of incivility, the use of outrage narratives on political blogs, talk radio and cable news opinion shows had in the decades prior become representative of a relatively new political opinion media genre which had experienced significant growth due to its profitability. 

Media critic David Denby writes, "Like a good standup comic, Trump invites the audience to join him in the adventure of delivering his act—in this case, the barbarously entertaining adventure of running a Presidential campaign that insults everybody." Denby's claim is that Trump is simply good at delivering the kind of political entertainment product consumers demand. He observes that "The movement's standard of allowable behavior has been formed by popular culture—by standup comedy and, recently, by reality TV and by the snarking, trolling habits of the Internet. You can't effectively say that Donald Trump is vulgar, sensational, and buffoonish when it's exactly vulgar sensationalism and buffoonery that his audience is buying. Donald Trump has been produced by America." 

Although Trump's outrage discourse was characterized by fictional assertions, mean spirited attacks against various groups and dog whistle appeals to racial and religious intolerance, media executives could not ignore its profitability. CBS's CEO Les Moonves remarked that "It may not be good for America, but it's damn good for CBS," demonstrating how Trumpism's form of messaging and the commercial goals of media companies are not only compatible but mutually lucrative. Peter Wehner, senior fellow at the Ethics and Public Policy Center considers Trump a political "shock jock" who "thrives on creating disorder, in violating rules, in provoking outrage."

The political profitability of incivility was demonstrated by the extraordinary amount of free airtime gifted to Trump's 2016 primary campaign—estimated at two billion dollars, which according to media tracking companies grew to almost five billion by the end of the national campaign. The advantage of incivility was as true in social media, where "a BuzzFeed analysis found that the top 20 fake election news stories emanating from hoax sites and hyperpartisan blogs generated more engagement on Facebook (as measured by shares, reactions, and comments) than the top 20 election stories produced by 19 major news outlets combined, including the New York Times, Washington Post, Huffington Post, and NBC News."

Social media 

Surveying research of how Trumpist communication is well suited to social media, Brian Ott writes that, "commentators who have studied Trump's public discourse have observed speech patterns that correspond closely to what I identified as Twitter's three defining features [Simplicity, impulsivity, and incivility]." Media critic Neal Gabler has a similar viewpoint writing that "What FDR was to radio and JFK to television, Trump is to Twitter." Outrage discourse expert Patrick O'Callaghan argues that social media is most effective when it utilizes the particular type of communication which Trump relies on. O'Callaghan notes that sociologist Sarah Sobieraj and political scientist Jeffrey M. Berry almost perfectly described in 2011 the social media communication style used by Trump long before his presidential campaign. 

They explained that such discourse "[involves] efforts to provoke visceral responses (e.g., anger, righteousness, fear, moral indignation) from the audience through the use of overgeneralizations, sensationalism, misleading or patently inaccurate information, ad hominem attacks, and partial truths about opponents, who may be individuals, organizations, or entire communities of interest (e.g., progressives or conservatives) or circumstance (e.g., immigrants). Outrage sidesteps the messy nuances of complex political issues in favor of melodrama, misrepresentative exaggeration, mockery, and improbable forecasts of impending doom. Outrage talk is not so much discussion as it is verbal competition, political theater with a scorecard."

Due to Facebook's and Twitter's narrowcasting environment in which outrage discourse thrives, Trump's employment of such messaging at almost every opportunity was from O'Callaghan's account extremely effective because tweets and posts were repeated in viral fashion among like minded supporters, thereby rapidly building a substantial information echo chamber, a phenomenon Cass Sunstein identifies as group polarization, and other researchers refer to as a kind of self re-enforcing homophily. Within these information cocoons, it matters little to social media companies whether much of the information spread in such pillarized information silos is false, because as digital culture critic Olivia Solon points out, "the truth of a piece of content is less important than whether it is shared, liked, and monetized." 

Citing Pew Research's survey that found 62% of US adults get their news from social media, Ott expresses alarm, "since the 'news' content on social media regularly features fake and misleading stories from sources devoid of editorial standards." Media critic Alex Ross is similarly alarmed, observing, "Silicon Valley monopolies have taken a hands-off, ideologically vacant attitude toward the upswelling of ugliness on the Internet," and that "the failure of Facebook to halt the proliferation of fake news during the [Trump vs. Clinton] campaign season should have surprised no one. ... Traffic trumps ethics."

O'Callaghan's analysis of Trump's use of social media is that "outrage hits an emotional nerve and is therefore grist to the populist's or the social antagonist's mill. Secondly, the greater and the more widespread the outrage discourse, the more it has a detrimental effect on social capital. This is because it leads to mistrust and misunderstanding amongst individuals and groups, to entrenched positions, to a feeling of 'us versus them'. So understood, outrage discourse not only produces extreme and polarising views but also ensures that a cycle of such views continues. (Consider also in this context Wade Robison (2020) on the 'contagion of passion' and Cass Sunstein (2001, pp. 98–136) on 'cybercascades'.)" Ott agrees, stating that contagion is the best word to describe the viral nature of outrage discourse on social media, and writing that "Trump's simple, impulsive, and uncivil Tweets do more than merely reflect sexism, racism, homophobia, and xenophobia; they spread those ideologies like a social cancer." 

Robison warns that emotional contagion should not be confused with the contagion of passions that James Madison and David Hume were concerned with. Robison states they underestimated the contagion of passions mechanism at work in movements, whose modern expressions include the surprising phenomena of rapidly mobilized social media supporters behind both the Arab Spring and the Trump presidential campaign writing, "It is not that we experience something and then, assessing it, become passionate about it, or not", and implying that "we have the possibility of a check on our passions." Robison's view is that the contagion affects the way reality itself is experienced by supporters because it leverages how subjective certainty is triggered, so that those experiencing the contagiously shared alternate reality are unaware they have taken on a belief they should assess.

Similar movements, politicians and personalities

Historical background in the United States 

The roots of Trumpism in the United States can be traced to the Jacksonian era according to scholars Walter Russell Mead, Peter Katzenstein and Edwin Kent Morris. Eric Rauchway says: "Trumpism—nativism and white supremacy—has deep roots in American history. But Trump himself put it to new and malignant purpose."

Andrew Jackson's followers felt he was one of them, enthusiastically supporting his defiance of politically correct norms of the nineteenth century and even constitutional law when they stood in the way of public policy popular among his followers. Jackson ignored the U.S. Supreme Court ruling in Worcester v. Georgia and initiated the forced Cherokee removal from their treaty protected lands to benefit white locals at the cost of between 2,000 and 6,000 dead Cherokee men, women, and children. Notwithstanding such cases of Jacksonian inhumanity, Mead's view is that Jacksonianism provides the historical precedent explaining the movement of followers of Trump, marrying grass-roots disdain for elites, deep suspicion of overseas entanglements, and obsession with American power and sovereignty, acknowledging that it has often been a xenophobic, "whites only" political movement. Mead thinks this "hunger in America for a Jacksonian figure" drives followers towards Trump but cautions that historically "he is not the second coming of Andrew Jackson," observing that "his proposals tended to be pretty vague and often contradictory," exhibiting the common weakness of newly elected populist leaders, commenting early in his presidency that "now he has the difficulty of, you know, 'How do you govern?'"

Morris agrees with Mead, locating Trumpism's roots in the Jacksonian era from 1828 to 1848 under the presidencies of Jackson, Martin Van Buren and James K. Polk. On Morris's view, Trumpism also shares similarities with the post-World War I faction of the progressive movement which catered to a conservative populist recoil from the looser morality of the cosmopolitan cities and America's changing racial complexion. In his book The Age of Reform (1955), historian Richard Hofstadter identified this faction's emergence when "a large part of the Progressive-Populist tradition had turned sour, became illiberal and ill-tempered."

Prior to World War II, conservative themes of Trumpism were expressed in the America First Committee movement in the early 20th century, and after World War II were attributed to a Republican Party faction known as the Old Right. By the 1990s, it became referred to as the paleoconservative movement, which according to Morris has now been re-branded as Trumpism. Leo Löwenthal's book Prophets of Deceit (1949) summarized common narratives expressed in the post-World War II period of this populist fringe, specifically examining American demagogues of the period when modern mass media was married with the same destructive style of politics that historian Charles Clavey thinks Trumpism represents. According to Clavey, Löwenthal's book best explains the enduring appeal of Trumpism and offers the most striking historical insights into the movement.

Writing in The New Yorker, journalist Nicholas Lemann states the post-war Republican Party ideology of fusionism, a fusion of pro-business party establishment with nativist, isolationist elements who gravitated towards the Republican and not the Democratic Party, later joined by Christian evangelicals "alarmed by the rise of secularism", was made possible by the Cold War and the "mutual fear and hatred of the spread of Communism". An article in Politico has referred to Trumpism as "McCarthyism on steroids".

Championed by William F. Buckley Jr. and brought to fruition by Ronald Reagan in 1980, the fusion lost its glue with the dissolution of the Soviet Union, which was followed by a growth of income inequality in the United States and globalization that "created major discontent among middle and low income whites" within and without the Republican Party. After the 2012 United States presidential election saw the defeat of Mitt Romney by Barack Obama, the party establishment embraced an "autopsy" report, titled the Growth and Opportunity Project, which "called on the Party to reaffirm its identity as pro-market, government-skeptical, and ethnically and culturally inclusive."

Ignoring the findings of the report and the party establishment in his campaign, Trump was "opposed by more officials in his own Party ... than any Presidential nominee in recent American history," but at the same time he won "more votes" in the Republican primaries than any previous presidential candidate. By 2016, "people wanted somebody to throw a brick through a plate-glass window", in the words of political analyst Karl Rove. His success in the party was such that an October 2020 poll found 58% of Republicans and Republican-leaning independents surveyed considered themselves supporters of Trump rather than the Republican Party.

Trend towards illiberal democracy 

Trumpism has been likened to Machiavellianism and to Benito Mussolini's Italian Fascism.

American historian Robert Paxton poses the question as to whether the democratic backsliding evident in Trumpism is fascism or not. As of 2017, Paxton believed it bore greater resemblance to plutocracy, a government which is controlled by a wealthy elite. Paxton changed his opinion following the 2021 storming of the United States Capitol, and stated that it is "not just acceptable but necessary" to understand Trumpism as a form of fascism. Sociology professor Dylan John Riley calls Trumpism "neo-Bonapartist patrimonialism" because it does not capture the same mass movement appeal of classical fascism to be fascism.

In 2015, British historian Roger Griffin stated Trump was not a fascist because he does not question the politics of the United States and he also does not want to outright abolish its democratic institutions. After the violent attempt to interfere with the peaceful transition of power by Trump supporters during the Capitol attack, Griffin maintained this writing "Trump is far too pathologically incoherent and intellectually challenged to be a fascist, and suffers from Attention Deficiency Disorder, lack of self-knowledge, capacity for denial, narcissism and sheer ignorance and lack of either culture or education to a degree that precludes the Machiavellian intelligence and voracious curiosity about and knowledge about contemporary history and politics needed to seize power in the manner of Mussolini and Hitler."

Argentine historian Federico Finchelstein believes significant intersections exist between Peronism and Trumpism because their mutual disregard for the contemporary political system (in the areas of both domestic and foreign policy) is discernible. American historian Christopher Browning considers the long-term consequences of Trump's policies and the support which he receives for them from the Republican Party to be potentially dangerous for democracy. In the German-speaking debate, the term initially appeared only sporadically, mostly in connection with the crisis of confidence in politics and the media and described the strategy of mostly right-wing political actors who wish to stir up this crisis in order to profit from it. German literature has a more diverse range of analysis of Trumpism.

In How to Lose a Country: The 7 Steps from Democracy to Dictatorship, Turkish author Ece Temelkuran describes Trumpism as echoing a number of views and tactics which were expressed and used by the Turkish politician Recep Tayyip Erdoğan during his rise to power. Some of these tactics and views are right-wing populism, demonization of the press, subversion of well-established and proven facts through the big lie (both historical and scientific), democratic backsliding such as dismantling judicial and political mechanisms; portraying systematic issues such as sexism or racism as isolated incidents, and crafting an ideal citizen.

Political scientist Mark Blyth and his colleague Jonathan Hopkin believe strong similarities exist between Trumpism and similar movements towards illiberal democracies worldwide, but they do not believe Trumpism is a movement which is merely being driven by revulsion, loss, and racism. Hopkin and Blyth argue that both on the right and on the left the global economy is driving the growth of neo-nationalist coalitions which find followers who want to be free of the constraints which are being placed on them by establishment elites whose members advocate neoliberal economics and globalism. 

Others emphasize the lack of interest in finding real solutions to the social malaise which have been identified, and they also believe those individuals and groups who are executing policy are actually following a pattern which has been identified by sociology researchers like Leo Löwenthal and Norbert Guterman as originating in the post-World War II work of the Frankfurt School of social theory. Based on this perspective, books such as Löwenthal and Guterman's Prophets of Deceit offer the best insights into how movements like Trumpism dupe their followers by perpetuating their misery and preparing them to move further towards an illiberal form of government.

Recent precursors 

Trump is considered by some analysts to be following a blueprint of leveraging outrage, which was developed on partisan cable TV and talk radio shows such as the Rush Limbaugh radio show—a style that transformed talk radio and American conservative politics decades before Trump. Both shared "media fame" and "over-the-top showmanship", and built an enormous fan base with politics-as-entertainment, attacking political and cultural targets in ways that would have been considered indefensible and beyond the pale in the years before them.

Both featured "the insults, the nicknames" (for example, Limbaugh called preteen Chelsea Clinton the "White House dog", Trump mocked the looks of Ted Cruz's wife); conspiracy theories (Limbaugh claiming the 2010 Obamacare bill would empower "death panels" and "euthanize" elderly Americans, Trump claiming he won the 2020 election by a landslide but it was stolen from him); both maintained global warming was a hoax, Barack Obama was not a natural-born U.S. citizen, and the danger of COVID-19 was vastly exaggerated by liberals. 

Both attacked Black quarterbacks (Limbaugh criticizing Donovan McNabb, Trump Colin Kaepernick); both mocked people with disabilities, with Limbaugh flapping his arms in imitation of the Parkinson's disease of Michael J. Fox, and Trump doing the same to imitate the arthrogryposis of reporter Serge F. Kovaleski, although he later denied he had done so.

Limbaugh, to whom Trump awarded the Presidential Medal of Freedom in 2020, preceded Trump in moving the Republican Party away from "serious and substantive opinion leaders and politicians", towards political provocation, entertainment, and anti-intellectualism, and popularizing and normalizing for "many Republican politicians and voters" what before his rise "they might have thought" but would have "felt uncomfortable saying". His millions of fans were intensely loyal and "developed a capacity to excuse ... and deflect" his statements no matter how offensive and outrageous, "saying liberals were merely being hysterical or hateful. And many loved him even more for it."

Future impact 
Writing in The Atlantic, Yaseem Serhan states Trump's post-impeachment claim that "our historic, patriotic, and beautiful movement to Make America Great Again has only just begun," should be taken seriously as Trumpism is a "personality-driven" populist movement, and other such movements—such as Berlusconism in Italy, Peronism in Argentina and Fujimorism in Peru, "rarely fade once their leaders have left office". Bobby Jindal and Alex Castellanos wrote in Newsweek that separating Trumpism from Donald Trump himself was key to the Republican Party's future following his loss in the 2020 United States presidential election.

Foreign policy 

In terms of foreign policy in the sense of Trump's "America First", unilateralism is preferred to a multilateral policy and national interests are particularly emphasized, especially in the context of economic treaties and alliance obligations. Trump has shown a disdain for traditional American allies such as Canada as well as transatlantic partners NATO and the European Union. Conversely, Trump has shown sympathy for autocratic rulers, such as Russian president Vladimir Putin, whom Trump often praised even before taking office, and during the 2018 Russia–United States summit. The "America First" foreign policy includes promises by Trump to end American involvement in foreign wars, notably in the Middle East, while also issuing tighter foreign policy through sanctions against Iran, among other countries.

Economic policy 

In terms of economic policy, Trumpism "promises new jobs and more domestic investment". Trump's hard line against export surpluses of American trading partners and general protectionist trade policies led to a tense situation in 2018 with mutually imposed punitive tariffs between the United States on the one hand and the European Union and China on the other. Trump secures the support of his political base with a policy that strongly emphasizes neo-nationalism and criticism of globalization. In contrast, the book Identity Crisis: The 2016 Presidential Campaign and the Battle for the Meaning of America suggested that Trump "radicalized economics" to his base of white working- to middle-class voters by the promoting the idea that "undeserving [minority] groups are getting ahead while their group is being left behind."

Beyond the United States

Canada 

According to Global News, Maclean's magazine, the National Observer, Toronto Star, and The Globe and Mail, there is Trumpism in Canada. In a November 2020 interview on The Current, immediately following the 2020 US elections, law professor Allan Rock, who served as Canada's attorney general and as Canada's ambassador to the U.N., described Trumpism and its potential impact on Canada. Rock said that even with Trump's losing the election, he had "awakened something that won't go away". He said it was something "we can now refer to as Trumpism"—a force that he has "harnessed" Trump has "given expression to an underlying frustration and anger, that arises from economic inequality, from the implications from globalisation." 

Rock cautioned that Canada must "keep up its guard against the spread of Trumpism, which he described as "destabilizing", "crude", "nationalistic", "ugly", "divisive", "racist", and "angry"; Rock added that one measurable impact on Canada of the "overtly racist behaviour" associated with Trumpism is that racists and white supremacists have become emboldened since 2016, resulting in a steep increase in the number of these organizations in Canada and a shockingly high increase in the rate of hate crimes in 2017 and 2018 in Canada.

Maclean's and the Star, cited the research of Frank Graves who has been studying the rise of populism in Canada for a number of years. In a June 30, 2020 School of Public Policy journal article, he co-authored, the authors described a decrease in trust in the news and in journalists since 2011 in Canada, along with an increase in skepticism which "reflects the emergent fake news convictions so evident in supporters of Trumpian populism." Graves and Smith wrote of the impact on Canada of a "new authoritarian, or ordered, populism" that resulted in the 2016 election of President Trump. They said 34% of Canadians hold a populist viewpoint—most of whom are in Alberta and Saskatchewan—who tend to be "older, less-educated, and working-class", are more likely to embrace "ordered populism", and are "more closely aligned" with conservative political parties. This "ordered populism" includes concepts such as a right-wing authoritarianism, obedience, hostility to outsiders, and strongmen who will take back the country from the "corrupt elite" and return it a better time in history, where there was more law and order. It is xenophobic, does not trust science, has no sympathy for equality issues related to gender and ethnicity, and is not part of a healthy democracy. The authors say this ordered populism had reached a "critical force" in Canada that is causing polarization and must be addressed.

According to an October 2020 Léger poll for 338Canada of Canadian voters, the number of "pro-Trump conservatives" has been growing in Canada's Conservative Party, which was under the leadership of Erin O'Toole at the time of the poll. Maclean's said this might explain O'Toole's "True Blue" social conservative campaign. The Conservative Party in Canada also includes "centrist" conservatives as well as Red Tories,—also described as small-c conservative, centre-right or paternalistic conservatives as per the Tory tradition in the United Kingdom. O'Toole featured a modified version of Trump's slogan—"Take Back Canada"—in a video released as part of his official leadership candidacy platform. At the end of the video he called on Canadians to "[j]oin our fight, let's take back Canada." 

In a September 8, 2020 CBC interview, when asked if his "Canada First" policy was different from Trump's "America First" policy, O'Toole said, "No, it was not." In his August 24, 2019 speech conceding the victory of his successor Erin O'Toole as the newly elected leader of the Conservative Party, Andrew Scheer cautioned Canadians to not believe the "narrative" from mainstream media outlets but to "challenge" and "double check ... what they see on TV on the internet" by consulting "smart, independent, objective organizations like The Post Millennial and True North. The Observer said Jeff Ballingall, who is the founder of the right-wing Ontario Proud, and is also the Chief Marketing Officer of The Post Millennial.

Following the 2020 United States elections, National Post columnist and former newspaper "magnate", Conrad Black, who had had a "decades-long" friendship with Trump, and received a presidential pardon in 2019, in his columns, repeated Trump's "unfounded claims of mass voter fraud" suggesting that the election had been stolen.

Europe 

Trumpism has also been said to be on the rise in Europe. Political parties such as the Finns Party and France's National Rally have been described as Trumpist in nature. Trump's former advisor Steve Bannon called Hungarian prime minister Viktor Orbán "Trump before Trump".

Brazil 
In Brazil, Jair Bolsonaro, sometimes referred to as the "Brazilian Donald Trump", who is often described as a right-wing extremist, sees Trump as a role model and according to Jason Stanley uses the same fascist tactics. Like Trump, Bolsonaro finds support among evangelicals for his views on culture war issues. Along with allies he publicly questioned Joe Biden's vote tally after the November election. Some analysts warn Brazil's ties with the US might be further corroded "by a blind belief in Trumpism and a lack of pragmatism".

Nigeria 
According to The Guardian and The Washington Post, there is a significant affinity towards Trump in Nigeria. Donald Trump's comments on the ethno-religious conflicts between Christians and the predominantly Muslim Fulani tribe has contributed to his popularity among  Christians in Nigeria, in which he stated: "We have had very serious problems with Christians who are being murdered in Nigeria. We are going to be working on that problem very, very hard because we cannot allow that to happen". Donald Trump is praised by the Indigenous People of Biafra (IPOB), a secessionist group that supports the independence of Biafra from Nigeria and is designated as a terrorist group by the Nigerian government. IPOB has claimed that he "believes in the inalienable right of an indigenous people to self-determination" and it also praised him for "the direct and serious manner he addressed and demanded immediate end to the serial slaughter of Christians in Nigeria, especially Biafran Christians".

After Trump's victory in the 2016 presidential election, IPOB leader Nnamdi Kanu wrote a letter to Trump that claimed his victory placed upon him a "historic and moral burden ... to liberate the enslaved nations in Africa". As Trump was inaugurated in January 2017, IPOB organized a rally in support of Trump that resulted in violent clashes with Nigerian security forces and resulted in multiple deaths and arrests. On January 30 2020, IPOB leader Nnamdi Kanu attended a Trump rally in Iowa as a special VIP guest, at the invitation of the Republican Party of Iowa. According to a 2020 poll from Pew Research, 58% of Nigerians had favorable views of Donald Trump, the fourth highest percentage globally. 

According to John Campbell of Council on Foreign Relations, Trump's popularity in Nigeria can be explained by a "manifestation of the widespread disillusionment in a country characterized by growing poverty, multiple security threats, an expanding crime wave, and a government seen as unresponsive and corrupt", and his popularity is likely to be reflective of wealthier urban Nigerians rather than the majority of Nigerians who live in rural areas or urban slums and are unlikely to have strong opinions on Trump.

Iran 

Donald Trump and his policy towards Iran has been praised by the Iranian opposition group 'Restart', which also supports American military action against Iran and offered to fight alongside Americans to overthrow the Iranian government. The group has adopted the slogan "Make Iran Great Again".

Restart has been compared to QAnon by Ariane Tabatabai, in terms of "conspiracist thinking going global". Among conspiracy theories advocated by the group is that Iran's Supreme Leader Ali Khamenei has died (or went into coma) in 2017 and a double plays his role in public.

Japan 

In Japan, in a speech to Liberal Democratic Party lawmakers in Tokyo on 8 March 2019, Steve Bannon said that Prime Minister Shinzo Abe is "Trump before Trump" and "a great hero to the grassroots, the populist, and the nationalist movement throughout the world." Shinzo Abe is described as a "right-wing nationalist" or "ultra-nationalist",  but whether he is a "populist" is controversial. Netto-uyoku is the term used to refer to netizens who espouse ultranationalist far-right views on Japanese social media, as well as in English to those who are proficient. Netto-uyoku are typically very friendly not only to Japanese nationalists but also to Donald Trump, and oppose liberal politics. They began spreading Trump's conspiracy theories in an attempt to overturn the 2020 American presidential election.

South Korea 

The politics of Yoon Suk-yeol, the president of South Korea, have been nicknamed "K-Trumpism" for his right-wing populist elements. Many media and experts outlets have characterized Yoon's anti-Chinese rhetoric, right-wing nationalism, hostility towards opposition and the critical media, negative attitudes toward feminism, and positive attitudes toward possessing nuclear weapons as "populism", "Trumpism" or "far-right".

See also 

 America First policy under the presidency of Donald Trump
 American nationalism in the Donald Trump presidency
 Civil rights movement
 Cult of personality
 Firehosing
 History of the United States (2008-present)
 John Birch Society
 The Lincoln Project
 List of conspiracy theories promoted by Donald Trump
 Political positions of Donald Trump
 Presidency of Donald Trump
 Reagan Democrat
 Reality distortion field
 Republican Voters Against Trump
 Radical right (United States)

Notes

References

Bibliography

Books 

 
 
 
 
 
 
 
 
 
 
 
 
 
 
 
 
 
 
 
 
 
 
 
 
 
 
  (Page numbers correspond to the ePub edition.)
  (Cited page numbers correspond to the online version of the 1949, at AJArchives.org.)

Articles 

 
 
 
 
 
 
 
 
 
 
 
 
 
 
 
 
 
 
 
 
 
 
 
 
 
 
 
 
 
 
 
 
 
 
 
 
 The Verso published English translation is of the article: 
 
 
 
 
 
 
 
 
 
 
 
 
 
 
 
 
 
 
 
 
 
 
 
 
 
 
 
 
 
 
 
 
 
 
 
 
 
 
 
 
 
 
 
 
 
 
 
 
 
 
 
 
 
 
 
 An earlier version appeared in peer reviewed journal Boundary 2: 
 
 
 
 
 
 
 
 
 
 
 
 
 
 
 
 
 
 
 
 
 
 
 
 
 
 
 
 
 
 
 
 
 
 
 
 
 
 
 
 
 Partial reprint: 
 
 
 
 
 
 
 
 
 
 
 
 
 
 
 
 
 
 
 
 
 
 
 
 
 
 
 
 
 
 
 
 
 
 
 
 
 
 
 
 
 
 
 
 
 
 
 
 
 
 
 
 
 
 
 
 
 
 
 
 
 
 
 
 
 
 
 
 
 
 
 
 
 
 
 
 
 
 
 
 
 
 
 
 
 
 
 
 
 
 
 
 
 
 
 
 
 
 
 
 
 
 
 
 
 
 
 
 
 
 
 
 
 
 
 
 
 
 
 
 
 
 
 
 
 
 
 
 
  Update November 10, 2020.
 
 
 
 
 
 

Trumpism
American nationalism
American political neologisms
Anti-immigration politics in the United States
Anti-intellectualism
Articles containing video clips
Cults of personality
Donald Trump
Donald Trump controversies
Fascism
Eponymous political ideologies
National conservatism
Political psychology
Political terminology of the United States
Populism
Protectionism in the United States
QAnon
Republican Party (United States)
Right-wing ideologies
Right-wing populism in the United States
Trump administration controversies
Christian nationalism
Disinformation operations
American fascist movements